Zanesovići is a village in the municipality of Bugojno, Bosnia and Herzegovina. In 1991, it had a population of 473.

Demographics 
According to the 2013 census, its population was 309.

References

Populated places in Bugojno